Iris is a northern district of Cluj-Napoca in Romania. It is largely an industrial district, a heritage of industrialisation under the post-war Communist government. It is a terminus for tram lines 100 and 102.

Districts of Cluj-Napoca